Mohd Amirul Izwan Yaacob (born 25 April 1986) is a Malaysian football referee. He has been a full international for FIFA since 2012.

Career

Amirul Izwan Yaacob started the professional refereeing in 2011 and was awarded his FIFA badge in 2012.

He refereed some matches in AFC Champions League and AFC Cup.

In 2015, he was selected for the U-17 World Cup in Chile.

In the end of season 2019, he was invited to be referee 2 matches in 2019 V.League 1 in the two last round.

AFC Asian Cup

References 

1986 births
Living people
Malaysian football referees
People from Perak
AFC Asian Cup referees